Federal Polytechnic, Bida is a polytechnic school based in Niger State, in north central Nigeria. It opened in 1977.

History 

Federal Polytechnic Bida was established 1977 following a decision of the Federal Government Nigeria to move the institution to Bida, Before then it was Federal College of Technology, Kano.

The first academic session started April 1978 with the population 211 students and 11 senior staff, 33 junior staff. Federal Polytechnic Bida is a Federal Government tertiary institution situated in Bida, Niger State, Nigeria, currently there seven faculties in the institution,

Faculties 
The institution has seven faculties:
School of Applied and Natural Sciences
School of Business Administration and Management
School of Engineering Technology
School of Basic and General Studies
School of Environmental Studies
School of Financial Studies
School of Information and Communication Technology

See also
List of polytechnics in Nigeria

References

 
Educational institutions established in 1977
1977 establishments in Nigeria
Federal polytechnics in Nigeria
Education in Niger State